HKW may refer to:

 Hackney Wick railway station, in London
 Haus der Kulturen der Welt, an art museum in Berlin
 Hazarat Karanwala railway station, in Pakistan
 HKW Chemnitz-Nord a German power station